UFC Fight Night: Gustafsson vs. Smith (also known as UFC Fight Night 153 or UFC on ESPN+ 11) was a mixed martial arts event produced by the Ultimate Fighting Championship that was held on June 1, 2019 at the Ericsson Globe in Stockholm, Sweden.

Background
A light heavyweight bout between former UFC Light Heavyweight Championship challengers Alexander Gustafsson and Anthony Smith was the event's headliner.

Luigi Vendramini was scheduled to face Nick Hein at the event. However, Vendramini pulled out of the bout in late April citing a knee injury and subsequent surgery. Hein remained on the card against Frank Camacho.

A welterweight bout between Bartosz Fabiński and Sergey Khandozhko was scheduled at the event. However it was reported on May 24, 2019 that Fabinski pulled out of the bout due to injury and he was replaced by newcomer Rostem Akman.

A light heavyweight bout between former title challenger Volkan Oezdemir and Ilir Latifi was expected to take place as the co-main, but Latifi pulled out two days before the event due to a back injury and the bout was canceled.

Results

Bonus awards
The following fighters received $50,000 bonuses:

Fight of the Night: No bonus awarded.
Performance of the Night: Anthony Smith, Aleksandar Rakić, Makwan Amirkhani and Leonardo Santos

See also 

 List of UFC events
 2019 in UFC
 List of current UFC fighters

References 

UFC Fight Night
2019 in mixed martial arts
Sport in Stockholm
Mixed martial arts in Sweden
2010s in Stockholm
June 2019 sports events in Sweden